St. Joseph's Cathedral is a Roman Catholic cathedral in Gulu, Gulu District, Uganda. It is the seat of Archbishop John Baptist Odama, head of the Roman Catholic Archdiocese of Gulu.

History 
Construction of the 5 000-seat cathedral, organized by the Comboni Missionary Brothers, was a massive effort. Brother Attilio Consolaro supervised the work from the beginning to the end, and in honor of this achievement, a street in Rome was named after him.

The work was started in the year 1931 and completed in 1941. The Brotherhood made and baked 800 000 bricks at the Oyitino River, from where Christians and Catechumens every Sunday after the Mass carried bricks on their heads to the site of building. The cathedral was consecrated on 13 June 1947, the Feast of the Most Sacred Heart of Jesus.

On 24 December 1938, while the work was still in progress, the first two priests from the Northern Region were ordained: Rev. Frs John Oῃom and Donasyano Bala.

The remains of Bishops Angelo Negri and Cipriano Kihangire were laid to rest in this cathedral. In 1994 the original roof with iron sheets was replaced by a roof of copper.

On 6 February 1993, Pope John Paul II entered the cathedral to adore the Holy Eucharist as thousands of people turned up to see him.

In 2000, the original floor was replaced by a new one. The interior and the exterior were redecorated in 2000 and 2001. From its establishment, it was run by the Comboni Missionaries up to 2006. The first diocesan priest to be a pastor of this cathedral was Fr. Gaudensio Langol Olango from 2007 to 2008, when he died in a road accident along Gulu–Kampala Highway.

Roman Catholic cathedrals in Uganda
Roman Catholic churches completed in 1941
20th-century Roman Catholic church buildings in Uganda